Mood Indigo is a song by Duke Ellington.

Mood Indigo may also refer to:
 Mood Indigo (album), a 1989 album by jazz saxophonist Frank Morgan
Mood Indigo (festival), annual cultural festival of the Indian Institute of Technology Bombay
Froth on the Daydream, a novel by Boris Vian, also published in English as Mood Indigo or Foam of the Daze
Mood Indigo (film), a 2013 film adaptation of the novel, directed by Michel Gondry
Mood Indigo, a single by the South Korean band Cheeze
Mood Indigo, a song by Dutch singer-songwriter Anouk